Dulcy Langfelder, better known as Dulcinea Langfelder is a multidisciplinary American artist (drama, dance, song, mime, multimedia). Born in Brooklyn, New York in 1955, she's the founder of Dulcinea Langfelder & Co.

The artist 

Dulcinea studied dance with Paul Sanasardo, then mime with the master, Étienne Decroux, in Paris.  She has studied theatre with Eugenio Barba and Yoshi Oida.
When Decroux's assistants, Jean Asselin and Denise Boulanger, returned to Montreal to establish their company, they invited Dulcinea to join la Troupe Omnibus. She moved to Montreal in 1978.

Dulcinea signed choreographies in over twenty musical comedy and television productions. Her diversified talent, her socio-satiric sense and her inspiration garnered her the honor of being named Personality of the year by the Montreal daily, La Presse, in 1990.

Main Plays 

 2018 Cheek to Cheek, l'amour avec un grand C
2016 Pillow Talk
 2008 Dulcinea's Lament
 1999 Victoria
 1994-1997 Portrait of Woman With Suitcase
 1990 Hockey! O.K.?
 1988-1996 The Lady Next Door
 1985 Vicious Circle

The Company 

In 1985, she founded her own company which she named Virtuous Circle Dance theatre. Since then her works have toured around the world. 
In 1997, she changed her company's name to Dulcinea Langfelder & Co.

Dulcinea Langfelder & Co. is a non-profit organization that creates and presents multidisciplinary shows worldwide. The company aims to brighten life with entertaining creations that also refreshes our minds and souls.
With a tragicomic background, her work combines drama, dance and multimedia, going through disciplinary and cultural barriers.

Dulcinea Langfelder & Co. created a total of seven shows, which have been broadcast in 7 languages on 5 continents.

Awards 

 2010 : Certificate of recognition for the Prix Hommage, Quebec Council for Elders, to Dulcinea Langfelder for her contribution to the betterment of the elder community's well-being, quality of life and participation in Quebec society. 
 2007 : Herald Angel, Edinburgh, for Victoria: critics prize of The Herald to recognize the excellence at the Edinburgh Fringe Festival (more than 2000 different shows are presented during the festival)
 2005 : " Favorite of the public " for Victoria played during the theatre festival L'Assomption, Quebec
 2000 : Montreal English Critics Circle Award (MECCA), Montreal to Ana Cappelluto for her stage design in Victoria (price of the Anglophones Montrealers critics circle).
 1990 : " Year Personality in Dance " to Dulcinea Langfelder by the newspaper La Presse, Montreal

References

External links 

 
 https://web.archive.org/web/20140223121559/http://www.agoradanse.com/en/spectacles/2009/victoria
 http://www.lapresse.ca/arts/spectacles-et-theatre/danse/200911/05/01-918655-victoria-une-attachante-vieille-femme.php
 http://www.johnlambert.ca/English/portfolios/dulcinea-langfelder/
 http://www.thedancecurrent.com/video/dulcinea-langfelder-cie-la-complainte-de-dulcin%C3%A9e
 https://www.canadahelps.org/CharityProfilePage.aspx?charityID=s12647
 http://www.lapresse.ca/arts/spectacles-et-theatre/theatre/200811/29/01-805616-dulcinee-et-dulcinea.php
 http://oscar.concordia.ca/events/DulcineasLament.pdf

1955 births
Living people
Canadian choreographers
Artists from Brooklyn
Canadian women choreographers